is a Japanese football player. He plays for Tokushima Vortis.

Career
Kazuki Nishiya joined J3 League club Tochigi SC in 2016.

He is the twin brother of Yuki Nishiya, who currently plays for Tochigi SC.

Club statistics
Updated to end of 2018 season.

References

External links
Profile at Tochigi SC

1993 births
Living people
Ryutsu Keizai University alumni
Association football people from Tochigi Prefecture
Japanese footballers
J2 League players
J3 League players
Tochigi SC players
Tokushima Vortis players
Association football midfielders